The Devils Postpile National Monument Ranger Cabin, in Devils Postpile National Monument is located on Minaret Summit Road, about  from the summit. It was listed on the National Register of Historic Places in 2015.

According to its NRHP nominationAs the oldest standing building in Devils Postpile National Monument, the ranger cabin provides a unique connection to the early period of NPS planning and development at the monument. It typifies the emphasis on efficiency, creative reuse of materials, and functional construction that became a feature of national park planning and development during the late 1930s and early 1940s. The cabin also embodies the utilitarian approach to planning that formed at Devils Postpile during its early years as a subsidiary of Yosemite National Park. Initially a response to severe budget and staffing constraints, the focus on maintaining quality visitor contacts with minimal facilities became a hallmark of Devils Postpile’s administrative evolution. The ranger cabin symbolizes the continuation of this management philosophy to the present and contributes significantly to the monument’s historic character.

References

External links

State of the cabin

Ranger stations in the United States
Buildings and structures in Madera County, California
National Register of Historic Places in Madera County, California
National Park Service rustic in California
Government buildings completed in 1941